Stenasodelphis is an extinct genus of pontoporiid dolphin from the mid-late Miocene epoch. Its name roughly translates to "the narrow-nosed dolphin." The genus is currently monotypic, containing only the species S. russellae. The specific epithet honors Mrs. Jean Hopper (née Russell), who discovered the holotype. It was found in material derived from zone 22-23 of St. Marys Formation, which dates to the early Tortonian.

References

River dolphins
Miocene cetaceans
Fossil taxa described in 2008